It Happened in Acapulco (Spanish: Sucedió en Acapulco) is a 1953 Mexican comedy drama film directed by Alejandro Galindo and starring Martha Roth, Raúl Martínez and Domingo Soler.

Main cast
 Martha Roth as Licha  
 Raúl Martínez as Raúl Montalvo  
 Domingo Soler as Don Sostenes 
 Angélica María as Maruca  
 Esther Luquín as Lolita  
 Alfredo Varela as Alberto  
 Maruja Grifell as Tía Sonia  
 José Jasso as Leyva, chantajista 
 Beatriz Saavedra as Alicia, nana  
 Salvador Quiroz as Señor juez  
 José Muñoz as Tío Laureano  
 Josefina Leiner as Sirvienta  
 Joaquín Roche as Conductor de tren  
 José Chávez as Manos brujas  
 Felipe de Flores as Anunciador radio  
 Bruno Márquez as Marido de Lolita

References

Bibliography 
 Mora, Carl J. Mexican Cinema: Reflections of a Society, 1896-2004. McFarland & Co, 2005.

External links 
 

1953 films
1953 comedy-drama films
Mexican comedy-drama films
1950s Spanish-language films
Films directed by Alejandro Galindo
Films set in Acapulco
Mexican black-and-white films
1950s Mexican films